Yeebo Town is a populated place in the River Gee County of Liberia.

References

Populated places in Liberia
River Gee County